The 1997 European 10,000m Cup, was the 1st edition of the European 10,000m Cup (the original name in 1997 was European 10,000m Challenge) and took place on 5 April in Barakaldo, Spain.

Individual

Men

Women

Team
In italic the participants whose result did not go into the team's total time, but awarded with medals.

References

External links
 Trofeo de Atletismo Ciudad de Barakaldo (official results)
 EAA web site

European 10,000m Cup
European Cup 10,000m